WYXB (105.7 FM), branded as "B105.7", is a radio station owned by Urban One in Indianapolis, Indiana.  The studios are located on Monument Circle in downtown Indianapolis.  The transmitter and antenna, according to the FCC, are located on the eastside of Indianapolis, near 2300 N. Hawthorne.

WYXB is one of two adult contemporary stations in Indianapolis; the other being WNTR, "107.9 The Mix".

History
A group formed WAIV, an all-classical FM station, it stayed on the air until 1967, when it ran out of advertising dollars.  The station began operation as classical music formatted WAIV in 1961 by the founders where they later formed Fine Arts Society of Indianapolis in 1968 now it is (Classical Music Indy on WICR.). In 1964, the station was located in the Dearborn Hotel on East Michigan Street.  (The Dearborn was built, originally, for a group called the CCC.  It is now home to a Wheeler Mission Community Center.)

The station's call letters changed to WTLC in 1968 by adopting an Urban Contemporary format; throughout the years, WTLC utilized several on-air brandings, including Soul Stereo FM 105 WTLC, WTLC FM 105, Fresh 105 WTLC, Power 105 WTLC, 105.7 The People's Station, 105.7 The Power, Power 105.7 FM, and 105.7 WTLC.

In 2000, Emmis Communications bought both WTLC-FM and AM.  Emmis sold WTLC-FM and AM (only the intellectual rights, the actual station license stayed in the Emmis fold) in February 2001, changing the call letters to WYXB, rebranded as "B 105.7", and changed formats to adult contemporary.

On June 13, 2022, Emmis announced it would sell its entire cluster in Indianapolis to Urban One.

Every year, from Thanksgiving to Christmas, B105.7 switches their name to "Indys Christmas Station".

Programming
WYXB currently broadcasts a gold-based adult contemporary music format. WYXB’s playlist spans from the 1980s to the present.  Its original positioning statement of "Soft Rock for a Busy World" has been shortened to just "Soft Rock."  It has since changed its slogan to "The BEST variety of the 80s, 90s, & TODAY". WYXB switches its format to continuous Christmas music during the holiday season between Thanksgiving and Christmas.

WYXB DJs Bernie Eagan and Eric Garnes are Indy radio veterans.  Its studios are included with WLHK, WIBC, and WFNI located at the Emmis World Headquarters on the southwest quadrant of Monument Circle.

References

External links

YXB
Urban One stations
Mass media in Indianapolis